Live Insanity is a live album by guitarist Tony MacAlpine, released in 1997 through Victor Entertainment and reissued on June 4, 2002 through Lion Music; the latter featuring different cover art and having apparently been released without the authorization of MacAlpine or Victor.

Track listing

Personnel
Tony MacAlpine – guitar, keyboard, production
Mike Terrana – drums
Ricky Riccardo – bass

References

External links
Tony MacAlpine "Live Insanity" at Guitar Nine Records (archived)

Tony MacAlpine albums
1997 live albums
Victor Entertainment live albums